William B. Richter (August 15, 1916 – November 20, 2007) was an American football, basketball, and baseball coach, as well as a college president. He served as the head men's basketball coach at Boise State University during the 1947–48 season.

Prior to his single season at Boise, Richter served as the head football coach (1946), head men's basketball coach (1946–1947), and athletic director at this alma mater, Minot State University.

Richter served as the head football coach at Valley City State University in Valley City, North Dakota from 1948 to 1950 and from 1952 to 1953. In 1975, he was named the college president of Ohlone College in Fremont, California, where he remained until his retirement in 1979.

Head coaching record

College football

References

External links
 

1916 births
2007 deaths
Basketball coaches from North Dakota
Heads of universities and colleges in the United States
Boise State Broncos football coaches
Boise State Broncos men's basketball coaches
Minot State Beavers football coaches
Minot State Beavers men's basketball coaches
Valley City State Vikings baseball coaches
Valley City State Vikings football coaches
High school football coaches in Montana
Minot State University alumni
People from Dickinson, North Dakota
Players of American football from North Dakota
20th-century American academics